Alessandro Alunni Bravi (born 23 November 1974) is an Italian lawyer and manager, best known for being Managing Director of the Sauber Group of companies since 2022 and Team Representative of Alfa Romeo F1 team since 2023. Throughout his Motorsports career, Alunni Bravi held the position of Team Principal and Managing Director of Trident Racing and General Counsel of ART Grand Prix and Spark Racing Technology, amongst other ventures, as well as acted as legal counsel for over twenty years.

Early life
Alunni Bravi was born in Umbertide, Italy, and grew up in Passignano sul Trasimeno, home to Coloni Motorsport, which competed in Formula One between 1987 and 1991. A racing fan since a young age, Alunni Bravi often attended the nearby Autodromo dell%27Umbria growing up. In 1999, he graduated with Honours in Civil Law from the University of Perugia, and subsequently collaborated as Assistant Lecturer within the Law department for two years.

Career
Alunni Bravi began working as legal counsel, ranging from Motorsports teams to drivers, athletes, and sports event companies. Between 2002 and 2003, he took on the role of Managing Director and Team Manager at Coloni Motorsport, which competed in Formula 3000 International. In 2002, the team was runner-up in the championship, collecting four wins with drivers Giorgio Pantano and Enrico Toccacelo. Alunni Bravi then moved on to WRC Rally Italia Sardinia, where he acted as General Manager for two seasons. From 2005 to 2008, he was Team Principal and Managing Director of Trident Racing, which debuted in 2006 in the then-GP2 Series. In the following years, Alunni Bravi began a collaboration with All Road Management, as well as taking on the role of General Counsel for ART Grand Prix, Spark Racing Technology, and Birel ART. In 2016, he founded his own management company, Trusted Talent Management, listing among his clients 2021-2022 Formula E World Champion, Stoffel Vandoorne, as well as Robert Kubica, Christian Lundgaard, and Gianmaria Bruni.

Sauber Group
From July 2017 onwards, Alunni Bravi has held the positions of Board Member and General Counsel of Sauber Group. In March 2022, he was appointed Managing Director, overviewing marketing, communications, sales, legal, and finance for the group of companies.

At the start of the 2023 season, Alunni Bravi was appointed to the additional position of Team Representative of Alfa Romeo F1 Team.

Personal life
Alunni Bravi has lived in Switzerland with his wife and son since 2011. He speaks fluent French and English. He plays tennis in his free time. Passionate about rallies and historic cars, Alunni Bravi took part in the 2022 edition of the Mille Miglia, the annual revival of the iconic endurance race, competing alongside Italian racing driver and TV host Vicky Piria in a classic Alfa Romeo 1900 Sport Spider.

References

Living people
Motorsport team owners
Formula One people
Italian sports agents
Motorsport agents
Italian motorsport people
Year of birth missing (living people)